Garci may refer to:

Given name
In chronological order
 Garci López de Padilla, Spanish noble, Grand Master of the military Order of Calatrava from 1296 to 1322, commander of the Castilian forces at the Siege of Gibraltar in 1309
 Garcí Méndez II de Sotomayor (1280–?), Spanish noble
 Garci Lasso de la Vega I (died 1328), Spanish noble
 Garci Lasso de la Vega II (died 1351), Spanish soldier
 Garci Lasso Ruiz de la Vega (1340–1367), Spanish noble
 Garci Álvarez de Toledo, Spanish noble, Grand Master of the religious and military Order of Santiago from 1359 to 1366
 Garci Rodríguez de Montalvo (c. 1450–1505), Castilian author
 Garci Sánchez de Badajoz (1460?–1526?), Spanish writer and poet
 Garcí Manuel de Carbajal (died 1552), Spanish lieutenant and soldier who founded the city of Arequipa (in what is now Peru)

Surname
 Gwen Garci, Filipina actress and model
 José Luis Garci, Spanish filmmaker

See also
 Virgilio Garcillano, Filipino politician
 Hello Garci scandal, Filipino political scandal
 Salinas de Garci Mendoza, a town in Bolivia
 Tony Garcy (born 1939), American weightlifter

Spanish-language surnames